Erechthias crypsimima is a species of moth in the family Tineidae. It was described by Edward Meyrick in 1920 using a specimen collected by George Vernon Hudson in Wellington in February. This species is endemic to New Zealand. Hudson noted that he collected the type specimen of this species from the black trunk of a beech tree.

References

External links

Image of type specimen of Erechthias crypsimima

Moths described in 1920
Erechthiinae
Moths of New Zealand
Endemic fauna of New Zealand
Taxa named by Edward Meyrick
Endemic moths of New Zealand